Ivory Coast competed at the 2000 Summer Paralympics. The country, competing at only their second Paralympic Games, was represented by 2 male athletes.  These were the country's second appearance at the Paralympic Games.

Medallists

See also
Ivory Coast at the 2000 Summer Olympics
Ivory Coast at the Paralympics

References

Bibliography

External links
International Paralympic Committee

Nations at the 2000 Summer Paralympics
Paralympics
2000